Yuraq Qaqa (Quechua yuraq white, qaqa rock, "white rock", Hispanicized spelling Yurac Ccacca) is a mountain in the Waywash in the Andes of Peru, about  high. It is situated in the Lima Region, Cajatambo Province, Cajatambo District. Yuraq Qaqa lies southwest of Pumarinri at the Pumarinri valley.

References

Mountains of Peru
Mountains of Lima Region